Katarn may refer to, in relation to the Star Wars video game series Dark Forces/Jedi Knight:

 Kyle Katarn, Jedi and protagonist of the Dark Forces/Jedi Knight series
 Morgan Katarn, a minor Star Wars character, Kyle Katarn's father, also a Jedi
 Patricia Katarn, a minor Star Wars character, Kyle Katarn's mother
 Katarn Commandos, fictional commando group named after a creature native to Kashyyyk of the same name
 Katarn-class armour, worn by the Republic Commandos in Star Wars Republic Commando (series)